Passion: Salvation's Tide Is Rising is a studio album by Passion. SixSteps Records released the album on January 1, 2016.

Critical reception

Graham Gladstone, indicating in a four star review at Worship Leader, describes, "unique flair." Rating the album a nine out of ten for Cross Rhythms, Brendan O'Regan says, "These are straight-up worship songs and will act as a support to people of faith." Matt Conner, affixing a four star rating upon the release at CCM Magazine, describes, "This is easily the best Passion worship release in several years." Allocating a three and a half star rating upon the release from Jesus Freak Hideout, Michael Weaver states, "Giving Salvation's Tide is Rising the studio treatment was an excellent decision." Mikayla Shriver, assigning the album four and a half stars from New Release Today, says, "Passion Conference is highly esteemed in the Christian world, and with albums like new Salvation's Tide Is Rising, it shouldn't be any other way." Awarding the album four stars at The Christian Manifesto, Cal Moore states, "it's pretty good." Michael Tackett, giving the album four stars from CM Addict, writes, "Lyrically it may stick to similar worship songs but the musical approach makes it stand out as one of the better worship records out there today." Reviewing the album for Hallels, Timothy Yap says, "after a few listens, less is definitely more here...Though there are fewer songs on Salvation's Tide is Rising than their previous albums, the songs here are tighter, more focused, and more inviting as far as congregational worship is concerned." Joshua Andre, signaling in a four star review by 365 Days of Inspiring Media, describes, "Salvation's Tide Is Rising hardly has any faults, and is just as good as its predecessors." Indicating in a four and a half star review at The Christian Beat, Madeleine Dittmer states, "Providing an incredible source of inspiration and hope to all who listen, this record offers fresh new songs that help to deepen our relationship with the Good, Good Father." Laura Chambers, allotting the album four stars from Today's Christian Entertainment, responds, "Salvation’s Tide Is Rising, in a refreshingly simple way, takes us back to the roots of our hope in Christ; love, grace, surrender."

Track listing

Chart performance

References

2016 albums
Passion (worship band) albums